Saros cycle series 106 for lunar eclipses occurred at the moon's ascending node, 18 years 11 and 1/3 days. It contained 73 events.

See also 
 List of lunar eclipses
 List of Saros series for lunar eclipses

Notes

External links 
 www.hermit.org: Saros 106

Lunar saros series